Vail is a census-designated place (CDP) in Pima County, Arizona, United States. The population was 10,208 at the 2010 census, up from 2484 in the 2000 census. The area is known for the nearby Colossal Cave, a large cave system, and the Rincon Mountains District of Saguaro National Park, a top tourism spot within Arizona.

Vail was originally a siding and water stop on the Southern Pacific Railroad. It was located on the last section of flat land before the train tracks followed the old wagon road into the Cienega Creek bed. Vail was named after pioneer ranchers Edward and Walter Vail, who established ranches in the area in the late 19th century. Vail deeded a right of way across his ranch to the railroad. Vail owned the Vail Ranch, his brother Walter Vail owned the nearby Empire Ranch, now part of the Las Cienegas National Conservation Area. An attempt to incorporate the town was defeated in 2013.

Geography
Vail is located at  (32.001939, -110.700286).

Demographics

2010 census
As of the census of 2010, there were 10,208 people residing in Vail, Arizona (a 248% increase from 2000). The population density was 561.2 people per square mile. According to the census, Vail is 69.8% non-Hispanic white, 3.3% Black or African American, 0.9% Native American, 2.4% Asian, 0.2% Pacific Islander, 5.0% from other races, and 4.1% were mixed race. People of Hispanic or Latino origin made up 19.4% of the population.

People from 0–4 years old were 7.5% of the population, children from ages 5–17 were 23.2% of the population, adults 18–64 were 62.0% of the total, and people 65 and over were 7.3% of the population.

2000 census
As of the census of 2000, there were 2,484 people, 842 households, and 675 families residing in the CDP. The racial makeup of the CDP was 87.2% White, 0.6% Black or African American, 0.5% Native American, 0.5% Asian, <0.1% Pacific Islander, 7.5% from other races, and 3.7% from two or more races. 16.6% of the population were Hispanic or Latino of any race.

There were 842 households, of which 43.2% had children under the age of 18 living with them, 69.2% were married couples living together, 6.8% had a female householder with no husband present, and 19.8% were non-families. 14.0% of all households had one occupant and 1.8% had someone living alone who was 65 years of age or older. The average household size was 2.95 and the average family size was 3.25.

In the CDP, the population was spread out, with 31.8% under the age of 18, 5.6% from 18 to 24, 33.3% from 25 to 44, 23.6% from 45 to 64, and 5.8% who were 65 years of age or older. The median age was 35 years. For every 100 females, there were 101.1 males. For every 100 females age 18 and over, there were 101.3 males.

The median income for a household in the CDP was $46,202, and the median income for a family was $53,958. Males had a median income of $37,418 versus $28,594 for females. The per capita income for the CDP was $19,892. About 6.1% of families and 6.3% of the population were below the poverty line, including 6.5% of those under age 18 and 7.5% of those age 65 or over.

See also

 Rincon Valley, Arizona
 Pantano, Arizona

References

External links
 Vail School District
 Greater Vail Area Chamber of Commerce
 Guide for Moving to Vail, Arizona
 Vail Voice
 Rita Ranch & Vail Community Info
 Rita Ranch & Vail Community Forum (Serving the community since 2006)
 David Leighton, "Street Smarts: East-side road named for Realtor/volunteer/activist," (Mary Ann Cleveland Way), Arizona Daily Star, July 28, 2014

Census-designated places in Pima County, Arizona
Populated places in the Sonoran Desert